Parag was a monthly Hindi children's magazine published from Delhi by The Times Group beginning in 1958. The magazine targeted nine-year-olds and older children. It was among the most popular children's magazines of its time, but stopped publication after more than a decade of publishing. Kanhaiyalal Nandan, Sarveshwar Dayal Saxena  and Harikrishna Devsare were the editors of Parag.

References

See also
List of magazines in India

Parag
Defunct magazines published in India
Hindi-language magazines
Magazines established in 1958
Magazines with year of disestablishment missing
Magazines published in Delhi
Monthly magazines published in India
Publications of The Times Group
1958 establishments in Delhi